Nevestino is a village in southwestern Bulgaria, part of Kyustendil Province. It is the administrative centre of Nevestino municipality, which lies in the central part of Kyustendil Province.

The village lies 13 kilometres from the provincial capital of Kyustendil, on both banks of the Struma River and near the Kyustendil-Dupnitsa and Kyustendil-Boboshevo-Blagoevgrad roads. Nevestino was first mentioned in 1576 under the name Gospozhino pole (Госпожино поле, "lady's field"); a parallel Ottoman Turkish name was Köprü ("[the] bridge"), referring to the famous bridge Kadin most in the village, which has existed since 1470. Nevestino's name roughly means "the bride's [place, field]", from the word nevesta (невеста), "bride", attested in Old Bulgarian НЄВѢСТА.

Municipality

Nevestino municipality has an area of 442 square kilometres and a population of around 3000 people. It includes the following 23 villages:

Honour
Nevestino Cove in Robert Island, South Shetland Islands is named after Nevestino.

References

External links
 Nevestino municipality website 

Villages in Kyustendil Province